The World Gastroenterology Organisation (WGO) is an international federation of over 100 national GI societies and 4 regional associations of gastroenterology representing over 50,000 individual members.

WGO is focused on "the improvement of standards in gastroenterology training and education on a global scale." 
  
The association was founded in 1935 and incorporated in 1958.  The WGO was originally known as the Organisation Mondiale de Gastroenterologie (OMGE) and was renamed the World Gastroenterology Organisation in 2006.

Its activities include educational initiatives such as Training Centers, Train the Trainers Workshops, public awareness campaigns such as World Digestive Health Day and Global Guidelines which cascade, providing viable solutions which are adaptable to varying resource levels around the world, as well as a quadrennial World Congress of Gastroenterology.

The WGO Foundation was incorporated in 2007 and is dedicated to raising funds to support the ongoing WGO education initiatives and activities.

History
Georges Brohée (1887–1957), a Belgian surgeon who promoted modern gastroenterology, is largely responsible for the origin of the WGO, in particular by founding the Belgian Society of Gastroenterology in 1928 and by organizing the first International Congress of Gastroenterology in Brussels in 1935.  In May 1958 the first World Congress of Gastroenterology was held in Washington DC, where Georges Brohée’s continuing efforts culminated in the constitution of the "Organisation Mondiale de Gastro-entérologie" (OMGE) on May 29, 1958.

Dr H.L. Bockus was the organisation’s first President.  His vision was to enhance standards of education and training in gastroenterology.

Developed nations were the initial focus of the organization, however today the WGO embraces a global approach with a special emphasis on developing regions

Structure
General management of the WGO is conducted by a Governing Council.  Acting through the Governing Council, the organisation is empowered to undertake those activities necessary to fulfill the goals and mission of the WGO.

The Executive Committee oversees various program and consists of  the President, Vice President, Past President, Secretary General, and Treasurer.

A General Assembly reviews and approves the work of the Governing Council and attends to other business (including the World Congress venue).  The General Assembly is composed of representatives from all WGO Member Societies and regional associations.  Each WGO Member Society has one vote in the General Assembly.

WGO has a number of committees including:

Finance Committee
WGO Guidelines and Publications Committee
Nominations Committee
Education & Training Committee
Editorial Board

The elections and renewal of the WGO officers and committees takes place on the occasion of the General Assembly, which is held during the quadrennial World Congress of Gastroenterology.

Activities

Educational initiatives

Training centers
There are currently 20 WGO Training Centers:

Bangkok, Thailand
Bogotá, Colombia
Cairo, Egypt
Karachi, Pakistan
La Paz, Bolivia
La Plata, Argentina
Mexico City, Mexico
Rabat, Morocco
Rome, Italy
Santiago, Chile
Soweto, South Africa
Suva, Fiji
San José, Costa Rica
Porto Alegre, Brazil
Ankara, Turkey
Lagos, Nigeria
Khartoum, Sudan
Xi'an, China
Porto, Portugal
New Delhi, India

Global Guidelines and Cascades

Each guideline is translated into six languages including English, French, Spanish, Portuguese, Russian and Mandarin Chinese.

Guidelines with cascades:

Acute diarrhea
Colorectal cancer screening
Constipation
Endoscope Disinfection
Esophageal varices
Helicobacter pylori in developing countries
Hepatitis B
Hepatocellular carcinoma: a global perspective
Inflammatory bowel disease: a global perspective
Irritable bowel syndrome: a global perspective 
Obesity
Radiation protection in the endoscopy suite

Guidelines with cascades in development:

Asymptomatic Gallstone Disease
Celiac Disease 
Diverticular Disease: Diverticulosis
Dysphagia 
Management of acute viral hepatitis 
Management of Ascites Complicating Cirrhosis in Adults
Management of Strongyloidiasis
Probiotics and Prebiotics

Public awareness campaigns

World Digestive Health Day/Year
The WGO celebrates World Digestive Health Day (WDHD) every May 29, initiating a worldwide public health campaign through its national societies and 50,000 individual members.  Each year, WDHD focuses upon a particular digestive disorder and seeks to increase general public awareness of prevention and therapy.  WDHD themes have included:

2005: Health and Nutrition
2006: Helicobacter pylori infection 
2007: Viral Hepatitis
2008: Optimal Nutrition in Health and Disease 
2009: Irritable Bowel Syndrome (IBS) 
2010: Inflammatory Bowel Disease (IBD)
2011: Enteric Infections: Prevention and Management – Clean Food, Clean Water, Clean Environment WDHD 2011 
2012: From Heartburn to Constipation – Common GI Symptoms in the Community: Impact and Interpretation WDHD 2012 
2013: LIVER CANCER: Act Today. Save Your Life Tomorrow. Awareness. Prevention. Detection. Treatment WDHD 2013 
2014: Gut Microbes – Importance in Health and Disease WDHD 2014 
2015: Heartburn: a Global Perspective WDHD 2015
2016: Diet and gut Health WDHD 2016

Advertising campaigns
In 2008, the WGO, together with Danone, launched a global campaign to improve digestive health, titled "Optimum Health and Nutrition."  The campaign is part of a three-year partnership between WGO and Danone to "help raise awareness of digestive disorders and the importance of maintaining good digestive health."

WGO Foundation
The WGO Foundation was established in 2007 to raise financial support to develop and sustain the World Gastroenterology Organisation's global training and education programs.  These programs focus primarily on developing, low-resource countries and aim to meet the increasing demand for digestive disorder prevention and treatment worldwide.

Mission
To raise financial support to develop and sustain WGO's global training and education programs, especially in developing and low-resource countries.

Activities
The WGO Foundation has fund raising activities including Initiating fund raising campaigns:
Global Mentor Fund
World Digestive Health Day/Year
Working in partnership programs with industry, philanthropic organizations etc...
Appealing to health care, wellness and other business organizations for donations/pledges
Applying for grants from international philanthropic organizations and public bodies
Appealing to eminent physicians to support Mentor Scholar Awards for trainees from developing low-resource countries 
Appealing to our WGO membership of 50,000
Appealing to the general public

References

External links

WGO Foundation
NHL – National Library of Guidelines
Intute: Health and Life Sciences - Information about the WGO
Head of UCC's School of Medicine elected President of the World Gastroenterology Organisation
Springer Web Alert about the WGO

Gastroenterology organizations
International medical and health organizations